Yasser Saeed Al-Qahtani (born 10 October 1982) is a former Saudi footballer who played as a forward for Al-Hilal FC in the Saudi Professional League. He was also captain of the Saudi Arabia national team. Yasser is widely recognized as one of the greatest Saudi footballers of the 21st century.

Club career
In 2005, Al-Qahtani moved to Al-Hilal from Al-Qadisiyah for a reported £2.5 million transfer fee.

After leading Saudi Arabia to the finals of the 2007 AFC Asian Cup as one of the tournament's top scorers, he won the Asian Footballer of the Year award. He went on trial at Manchester City in December.

In 2011, struggling for form following injuries and having lost his place in the Al-Hilal starting lineup, Al-Qahtani joined United Arab Emirates club Al Ain on a season-long loan. There he contributed to the club's first league title since 2004 scoring 7 goals in 15 league appearances, and 12 goals in a total of 26 games across all competitions. Having regained his form he returned to Al-Hilal after the loan spell ended.

Coached by Sami Al-Jaber and Laurențiu Reghecampf, Al-Qahtani reached the finals of the 2014 AFC Champions League with Al-Hilal where his team finished runners up losing to Western Sydney Wanderers in the final 1–0 on aggregate.

International career

2006 World Cup
Al-Qahtani played in the 2006 FIFA World Cup in Germany where he scored a goal against Tunisia.

2007 Asian Cup
At the 2007 AFC Asian Cup, Saudi Arabia reached the final under new Brazilian coach dos Anjos with Al-Qahtani becoming the tournament's top scorer.

2010 World Cup qualification campaign
In the final stages of the 2010 World Cup qualification, Al-Qahtani was injured in the game against Uzbekistan and upon his return from injury remained out form due to lack of playing time at Al-Hilal. Saudi Arabia missed qualification to the World Cup failing to beat North Korea at home in Riyadh in the decisive last game with the match ending goalless.

Career statistics

Club

International

International goals
Scores and results list Saudi Arabia's goal tally first.

Honours

Club

Al-Hilal
 Saudi Professional League (5): 2007–08, 2009–10, 2010–11, 2016–17, 2017–18
 Crown Prince Cup (7): 2005–06, 2007–08, 2008–09, 2009–10, 2010–11, 2012–13, 2015–16
 Saudi Super Cup (1): 2015
 King Cup (2): 2015, 2017
 Federation Cup (1): 2005–06
 AFC Champions League: Runner-up 2014, 2017
Al Ain
 UAE Arabian Gulf League (1): 2011–12

International
Saudi Arabia
AFC Asian Cup: Runner-up 2007
Arabian Gulf Cup (1): 2003
Arab Nations Cup (1): 2002
Islamic Solidarity Games: 2005

Individual
 AFC Asian Footballer of the Year: 2007
 AFC Asian Cup Top scorer: 2007
 AFC Asian Cup Fans' All Time Best XI: 2018

See also
 List of men's footballers with 100 or more international caps

References

External links

 
 
 
 

1982 births
Living people
Saudi Arabian footballers
Saudi Arabia international footballers
Association football forwards
Al-Qadsiah FC players
Al Hilal SFC players
Al Ain FC players
Saudi Arabian expatriate footballers
Saudi First Division League players
Saudi Professional League players
UAE Pro League players
Expatriate footballers in the United Arab Emirates
Saudi Arabian expatriate sportspeople in the United Arab Emirates
2004 AFC Asian Cup players
2006 FIFA World Cup players
2007 AFC Asian Cup players
2011 AFC Asian Cup players
Asian Footballer of the Year winners
FIFA Century Club
People from Khobar